Frank Busemann (born 26 February 1975 in Recklinghausen) is a former German decathlete. He currently works as a pundit for athletics coverage by German TV channel Das Erste.

Busemann started his career as a 110 m hurdler and was junior world champion in this discipline in 1994. After his surprising decathlon silver medal at the 1996 Summer Olympics with his personal best of 8706 points he became one of Germany's most popular sportsmen. He also was named German Sportsman of the Year. At the World Championships of the following year Busemann came third.

After these successes Busemann confronted severe injuries from which he only recovered partly. He made a comeback at the 2000 Olympics where he finished in seventh place. In 2003, at the age of just 28, he retired because of his deteriorating physical condition. His personal best of 8706 points ranks him fourth among German decathletes, behind Jürgen Hingsen, Uwe Freimuth and Siegfried Wentz.

Achievements

References

External links
 
 
 
 Personal website

1975 births
Living people
German male hurdlers
German decathletes
Olympic decathletes
Olympic athletes of Germany
Olympic silver medalists for Germany
Olympic silver medalists in athletics (track and field)
Athletes (track and field) at the 1996 Summer Olympics
Athletes (track and field) at the 2000 Summer Olympics
Medalists at the 1996 Summer Olympics
World Athletics Championships athletes for Germany
World Athletics Championships medalists
People from Recklinghausen
Sportspeople from Münster (region)